Twin Star Exorcists is an anime series produced by Pierott based on the manga series of the same name by Yoshiaki Sukeno. The series was broadcast between April 6, 2016 and March 29, 2017 on TV Tokyo and other TX Network stations, and later on AT-X. The first twenty episodes are adapted from the manga's storyline, but beginning with episode 21, the series diverges into an original story. 

The second opening theme, "Re:Call", is performed by the idol group i☆Ris, while the second ending theme,  is performed by the two-man group Itowokashi (Kashitarō Itō and Ryō Miyada). The third opening theme, "sync" is performed by lol the music director, while the third ending theme "Hide & Seek" is performed by Girlfriend. The fourth opening theme, "Kanadeai" is performed by Itowokashi, while the fourth ending theme "Hotarubi" is performed by Wagakki Band.

Episode list

References

Twin Star Exorcists